Disallow is the third album by High Rise, released on May 25, 1996, through P.S.F. Records.

Track listing

Personnel 
High Rise
Asahito Nanjo – vocals, bass guitar, engineering
Munehiro Narita – guitar
Pill – drums
Production and additional personnel
Space Grotesque – cover art
High Rise – production

References

External links 
 

1996 albums
High Rise (band) albums
P.S.F. Records albums